Juan Ignacio Pérez Iglesias, (born in 1960 Salamanca is Professor of Physiology and was rector of the University of the Basque Country from 2004 until 2008.

Life 
He graduated with a PhD in Biology in 1986.

Since 1994 he has been working different positions of responsibility in the university field: First worked as secretary and department director, later occupied a vice-dean's post and finally the vice-rector of the university, before being appointed rector. 

In 1999, he became a member of the EITB Board of Directors, from 2000 to 2002, he was part of the Euskera Advisory Council, and in the same year he was appointed by the Senate member of the University Coordination Council. He is a part of the Scientific and Technological Council of the FECY.

Works 
 Juan Ignacio Pérez Iglesias, Pello Salaburu (2003) Unibertsitatea eta euskal gizartea, gaur (La Universidad y la sociedad vasca, hoy. Pamplona: Pamiela, 2405
 Juan Ignacio Pérez Iglesias, Pello Salaburu, Ludger Mees (2004) Sistemas Universitarios en Europa y EEUU. Madrid: Academia Europea de Ciencias y Artes, 253.
 VV.AA, (2008) Misterios a la luz de la ciencia. Universidad Del Pais Vasco, .

References

External links 

 Juan Ignacio Pérez Iglesias personal website

1960 births
Living people
Recipients of the Presidential Medal of Merit (Philippines)